John Dwyer is an American multi-instrumentalist, vocalist, songwriter, visual artist and record label owner. He is best known as the founding member and primary songwriter of the garage rock band Osees, with whom he has released 23 studio albums. In addition to his work with Osees, Dwyer records solo material under the name "Damaged Bug". From 2020-2021, Dwyer released several improvisation-based records with a rotating collective of different artists, including "Bent Arcana", "Witch Egg", "Endless Garbage", "Moon Drenched" and "Gong Splat". He is also a former member of the garage rock acts Coachwhips, Pink and Brown and The Hospitals.

Dwyer is currently based in Los Angeles, California, although for much of his career he was based in San Francisco, California. Dwyer is originally from Providence, Rhode Island, where he first began playing.

He has been in and fronted several underground American bands since 1997. In 2003, John Dwyer met Brian Lee Hughes while he was filming Rock Star Scars, which Dwyer contributed Coachwhips music to, as well as having a part in the film. In 2006, Dwyer met Matt Jones at a party, and together, with Brian Lee Hughes, they founded Castle Face Records. John Dwyer is one of the curators of the famous Dutch festival Le Guess Who in November 2021.

Discography

Studio albums

With Coachwhips 
Hands On The Controls (2002)
Get Yer Body Next Ta Mine (2002)
Bangers Versus Fuckers (2003)
Peanut Butter And Jelly Live At The Ginger Minge (2005)
Double Death (2006)

With Pink And Brown 
Final Foods (2001)
Pink And Brown/Death Drug Split 12 inch (2002)
Shame Fantasy II (2003)

With Zeigenbock Kopf 
I.D.M. LP (2002)
Nocturnal Submissions (2003)
Fuck You to Dust (2006)

With The Hospitals 
I've Visited the Island of Jocks and Jazz (2005)

With Yikes 
Whoa Comas or Blood Bomb (2006)
Secrets To Superflipping (2006)

With Dig That Body Up, It's Alive 
A Corpse Is Forever (2007)

With Sword + Sandals 
Good & Plenty (2010)

With Thee Oh Sees 
As OCS
1 (2003)
2 (2004)
Songs About Death & Dying Vol. 3 (2005)
OCS 4: Get Stoved (2005)
Memory of a Cut Off Head (2017)

As The Oh Sees
Grave Blockers (2006)
The Cool Death of Island Raiders (2006)
Sucks Blood (2007)

As Thee Oh Sees
The Master's Bedroom Is Worth Spending a Night In (2008)
Thee Hounds of Foggy Notion (2008) 
Help (2009)
Dog Poison (2009)
Warm Slime (2010)
Castlemania (2011)
Carrion Crawler/The Dream (2011)
Putrifiers II (2012)
Floating Coffin (2013)
Drop (2014)
Mutilator Defeated at Last (2015)
A Weird Exits (2016)
An Odd Entrances (2016)

As Oh Sees
 Orc (2017)
 Smote Reverser (2018)
 Face Stabber (2019)

As Osees
 The 12" Synth (2019)
 Protean Threat (2020)
 Metamorphosed (2020)
 Panther Rotate (2020)
 Weirdo Hairdo (2020)
 A Foul Form (2022)

As Damaged Bug
Hubba Bubba (2014)
Cold Hot Plumbs (2015)
The Tarot of Personal Experience (2016)
Bunker Funk (2017)
Bug On Yonkers (2020)

With Bent Arcana 
Bent Arcana (2020)

With Witch Egg 
Witch Egg (2021)

With Endless Garbage 
Endless Garbage (2021)

With Moon Drenched 
Moon Drenched (2021)

With Gong Splat 
Gong Splat (2021)

References

External links
 AllMusic
 Thee Oh Sees
 Castle Face Records

Living people
American rock guitarists
American male guitarists
Songwriters from Rhode Island
Guitarists from Rhode Island
21st-century American guitarists
21st-century American male musicians
American male songwriters
1974 births